WD repeat domain 47 is a protein that in humans is encoded by the WDR47 gene.

Model organisms				

Model organisms have been used in the study of WDR47 function. A conditional knockout mouse line, called Wdr47tm1a(EUCOMM)Wtsi was generated as part of the International Knockout Mouse Consortium program — a high-throughput mutagenesis project to generate and distribute animal models of disease to interested scientists.

Male and female animals underwent a standardized phenotypic screen to determine the effects of deletion. Twenty-six tests were carried out on mutant mice and three significant abnormalities were observed. Homozygous mutant animals had an absence of corpus callosum and increased circulating alkaline phosphatase levels. Male homozygous mice also had abnormal indirect calorimetry measures.

See also 
 WD repeat

References

Further reading 
 
 
 
 
 
 

Genes mutated in mice